These are the Billboard magazine Hot Dance Airplay number-one hits of 2009.

Note that Billboard publishes charts with an issue date approximately 7–10 days in advance.

See also
2009 in music
List of number-one dance singles of 2009 (U.S.)

Notes
Kim Sozzi's 2008 single "Feel Your Love" was the number one single in 2009. It qualified for the 2009 year-end chart because Billboard starts tracking weekly charts every November of the previous year.

References

2009
United States Dance Airplay
Number-one dance airplay hits